Temno (Czech "darkness") is a 1950 Czechoslovak drama film directed by Karel Steklý after the novel Darkness by Alois Jirásek.

Cast
 Otýlie Beníšková
 Zdeněk Bittl
 Vítězslav Bocek
 Ladislav Boháč
 Terezie Brzková
 Gabriela Bártlová
 Otto Čermák
 Eduard Cupák
 Rudolf Deyl
 Karel Dostál
 Eman Fiala

References

External links
 

1950 films
1950s historical drama films
Czechoslovak drama films
1950s Czech-language films
Czech black-and-white films
Czechoslovak black-and-white films
Films based on works by Alois Jirásek
Films directed by Karel Steklý
Czech historical drama films
1950 drama films
1950s Czech films